Andrewes is a surname, and may refer to:

 Antony Andrewes (1910–1990), British classical scholar and historian
 Sir Christopher Andrewes (1896–1988), British virologist
 Sir Frederick William Andrewes (1859–1932), British physician and bacteriologist
 Gerrard Andrewes (1750–1825), English churchman, Dean of Canterbury from 1809
 Herbert Edward Andrewes (1863–1950), British entomologist
 Lancelot Andrewes (1555–1626), English bishop and theologian
 Philip Andrewes (born 1941), Canadian former politician
 Roger Andrewes (died 1635), English clergyman and scholar, brother of Lancelot
 Sir Thomas Andrewes (died 1659), London financier who supported the parliamentary cause during the English Civil Wars
 Sir William Andrewes (1899–1974), British admiral

See also
Andrewe
Andrews (disambiguation)